Silver Lakes is an eastern residential area of Pretoria, South Africa. It lies on the northern slopes of the Bronberg, part of the Magaliesberg mountains.

References

Suburbs of Pretoria